Pujiang-1, also known as PJ-1, is a Chinese technology demonstration satellite designed to promote the construction of smart cities in China. PJ-1 also  monitors weather, traffic and population density of a city. It is the first Chinese satellite that uses 3D printing for the titanium structure of its antenna. It also features a Wi-Fi router providing a communication network between satellites.

Launch 
PJ-1 was launched on 25 September 2015 at 1:41 UTC from the Jiuquan Satellite Launch Center (JSLC) in China.

Orbit 
The launch rocket Chang Zheng 11 (Long March 11) delivered PJ-1 satellite into a Sun-synchronous orbit (SSO) at an altitude of about 299 miles (481 km), inclined 97.3 degrees.

References 

Spacecraft launched in 2015
2015 in China
Satellites of China